Industrial stormwater is runoff from precipitation (rain, snow, sleet, freezing rain, or hail) that lands on industrial sites (e.g. manufacturing facilities, mines, airports). This runoff is often polluted by materials that are handled or stored on the sites, and the facilities are subject to regulations to control the discharges.

Regulation in the United States

In the United States, facilities that discharge industrial stormwater to surface waters must obtain a permit under the National Pollutant Discharge Elimination System (NPDES), pursuant to the Clean Water Act. Stormwater permit regulations issued by the United States Environmental Protection Agency (EPA) govern the permit process. EPA published its "Phase I" stormwater rule, which covers industrial dischargers, in 1990.

Most stormwater permits in the U.S. are issued by the agencies in 47 states that have been given authority by EPA. EPA regional offices issue the stormwater permits in the remaining parts of the country.

Multi-sector general permit
EPA published its Multi-Sector General Permit (MSGP) initially in 1995 to govern how industrial stormwater should be managed, and periodically it has updated and reissued the permit. The 2021 MSGP covers 30 industrial and commercial sectors:
Timber Products Facilities (including wood preservation)
Paper and Allied Products Manufacturing Facilities
Chemical and Allied Products Manufacturing and Refining
Asphalt Paving and Roofing Materials and Manufacturers and Lubricant Manufacturers
Glass, Clay, Cement, Concrete, and Gypsum Product Manufacturing Facilities
Primary Metals Facilities
Metal Mining (Ore Mining and Dressing) Facilities
Coal Mines and Coal Mining-Related Facilities
Oil and Gas Extraction Facilities
Mineral Mining and Processing Facilities
Hazardous Waste Treatment, Storage, or Disposal Facilities

Landfills and Land Application Sites
Automobile Salvage Yards
Scrap Recycling and Waste Recycling Facilities
Steam Electric Power Generating Facilities, including Coal Handling Areas
Motor Freight Transportation Facilities, Passenger Transportation Facilities, Petroleum Bulk Oil Stations and Terminals, Rail Transportation Facilities, and United States Postal Service Transportation Facilities
Water Transportation Facilities with Vehicle Maintenance Shops and/or Equipment Cleaning Operations
Ship and Boat Building or Repair Yards
Vehicle Maintenance Areas, Equipment Cleaning Areas, or Deicing Areas Located at Air Transportation Facilities
Sewage treatment plants
Food and Kindred Products Facilities
Textile Mills, Apparel, and Other Fabric Products Manufacturing Facilities
Wood and Metal Furniture and Fixture Manufacturing Facilities
Printing and Publishing Facilities
Rubber, Miscellaneous Plastic Products, and Miscellaneous Manufacturing Industries
Leather Tanning and Finishing Facilities
Fabricated Metal Products Manufacturing Facilities
Transportation Equipment, Industrial, or Commercial Machinery Manufacturing Facilities
Electronic and Electrical Equipment and Components, Photographic, and Optical Goods Manufacturing Facilities
Other industrial facilities not in the above categories that are designated by the permit authority as needing a permit

The permit is applicable to facilities in Massachusetts, New Hampshire, New Mexico, the District of Columbia and federal insular areas (territories). The other states have developed their own state-specific industrial stormwater permits (e.g. California's Industrial General Permit). State-issued general permits often include the same requirements as EPA's permit, but some states have additional requirements.

Construction site stormwater
Under EPA regulations, stormwater runoff from construction sites is also classified as industrial stormwater, however these discharges are covered by a separate set of permits. EPA periodically publishes its Construction General Permit and the approved state agencies publish similar permits, to regulate discharges from construction sites of 1 acre (4,000 m2) or more.  In addition to implementing the NPDES requirements, many states and local governments have enacted their own stormwater management laws and ordinances, and some have published stormwater treatment design manuals. Some of these state and local requirements have expanded coverage beyond the federal requirements. For example, the State of Maryland requires erosion and sediment controls on construction sites of 5,000 sq ft (460 m2) or more.

See also
 Industrial wastewater treatment
 Stormwater
 United States regulation of point source water pollution

References

Environmental protection
Stormwater management
Water pollution in the United States